Harold Christian Hagen (November 10, 1901 – March 19, 1957) was a Minnesota politician. He was a Farmer-Laborite and then a Republican, serving the ninth district from 1943 to 1955.

Born in Crookston, Minnesota, he was Lutheran of Norwegian ancestry. He attended St. Olaf College and then began as a publisher and editor of a Norwegian language newspaper and publisher of the Polk County Leader in Crookston.

He later served as secretary to Representative Richard T. Buckler. Succeeding Buckler, Hagen was elected as a candidate of the Farmer-Labor Party to the House of Representatives, representing Minnesota's 9th congressional district. He was subsequently reelected as a Republican U.S. Representative from 1943 to 1955. After his defeat in the United States House election, 1954, Hagen worked in Washington, D.C.'s public relations business. All together, he served in the 78th, 79th, 80th, 81st, 82nd, and 83rd congresses (January 3, 1943 – January 3, 1955).

External links

1901 births
1957 deaths
People from Crookston, Minnesota
American people of Norwegian descent
American Lutherans
Minnesota Farmer–Laborites
Farmer–Labor Party members of the United States House of Representatives
Republican Party members of the United States House of Representatives from Minnesota
American publishers (people)
20th-century American businesspeople
St. Olaf College alumni
20th-century American politicians
20th-century Lutherans